Karolus is a masculine given name. Notable people with the name include:

 Hans Karolus Ommedal (1901-1984), Norwegian politician
 Karolus Magnus (742-814), King of the Franks

See also
 Carolus (disambiguation)

Norwegian masculine given names
Masculine given names